The National Federation of Automobile Transport Workers (Zenjiko Roren) is a trade union representing passenger vehicle drivers in Japan.

The union was founded in 1947, and later affiliated to the General Council of Trade Unions of Japan.  By 1970, it had 58,577 members.  From the late 1980s, it has been affiliated to the Japanese Trade Union Confederation.  It still had 35,285 members in 2009, but by 2020 its membership had fallen to 9,515.

External links

References

Transport trade unions in Japan
Trade unions established in 1947
1947 establishments in Japan